Bartlett may refer to:

Places 
Bartlett Bay, Canada, Arctic waterway
 Wharerata, New Zealand, also known as Bartletts

United States
 Bartlett, Illinois
 Bartlett station, a commuter railroad station
 Bartlett, Iowa
 Bartlett, Kansas
 Bartlett, Missouri
 Bartlett, Nebraska
 Bartlett, New Hampshire, a New England town
 Bartlett (CDP), New Hampshire, a village in the town
 Bartlett Haystack, a mountain
 Bartlett, Ohio
 Bartlett, Tennessee
 Bartlett, Texas
 Bartlett, Virginia
 Bartlett Creek (disambiguation)
 Bartlett Peak, a mountain in California
 Bartlett Pond (Plymouth, Massachusetts)

Other uses 
 Bartlett (surname)
 Bartlett (TV series)
 The Bartlett, the Faculty of the Built Environment at University College London
 Bartlett Glacier, in Antarctica
 Bartlett pear
 Bartlett's Familiar Quotations or simply Bartlett's
 Bartlett's test, in statistics
 MV Bartlett, former ferry in Alaska
 USNS Bartlett (T-AGOR-13), American oceanographic research ship

See also
 Justice Bartlett (disambiguation)